Goran Sukno (born 6 April 1959 in Dubrovnik) is a Croatian former water polo player. He was an Olympic gold medal winner as a member of the Yugoslav water polo team at the 1984 Summer Olympics.

His son Sandro Sukno (born 1990) is an international water polo player for Croatia.

See also
 Yugoslavia men's Olympic water polo team records and statistics
 List of Olympic champions in men's water polo
 List of Olympic medalists in water polo (men)
 List of world champions in men's water polo
 List of World Aquatics Championships medalists in water polo

References

External links
 

1959 births
Living people
Croatian male water polo players
Yugoslav male water polo players
Olympic water polo players of Yugoslavia
Olympic gold medalists for Yugoslavia
Sportspeople from Dubrovnik
Water polo players at the 1984 Summer Olympics
Olympic medalists in water polo
Medalists at the 1984 Summer Olympics